James Sewell (born 3 February 1956) is a former Australian rules footballer who played for Footscray in the Victorian Football League (VFL) during the 1980s.

Born in Geraldton, Sewell joined West Australian Football League (WAFL) club East Fremantle and was centre half forward in their 1979 premiership team, with a reputation for high flying marks. When he crossed to Footscray in 1983 he was used initially as a full-back but the following season Sewell played up forward, kicking 28 goals. He was a losing Preliminary Finalist in 1985, kicking two goals in the loss to Hawthorn.

A regular Western Australian representative, Sewell played in the 1979 Perth State of Origin Carnival.

Following his retirement from football, Sewell served as the Football Manager of the Brisbane Bears.

References

Holmesby, Russell and Main, Jim (2007). The Encyclopedia of AFL Footballers. 7th ed. Melbourne: Bas Publishing.

1956 births
Living people
Western Bulldogs players
East Fremantle Football Club players
Western Australian State of Origin players
Australian rules footballers from Geraldton